Nephrolepis is a genus of about 30 species of ferns. It is the only genus in the family Nephrolepidaceae, placed in the suborder Aspleniineae (eupolypods I) of the order Polypodiales in the Pteridophyte Phylogeny Group classification of 2016 (PPG I). (It is placed in the Dryopteridaceae in some other classifications.) The genus is commonly referred to as macho ferns or Boston ferns. The fronds are long and narrow, and once-pinnate, in the case of one Bornean species reaching thirty feet (nine meters) in length.

Phylogeny
The following cladogram for the suborder Polypodiineae (eupolypods I), based on the consensus cladogram in the Pteridophyte Phylogeny Group classification of 2016 (PPG I), shows a likely phylogenetic relationship between Nephrolepidaceae and the other families of the clade.

Selected species
 Nephrolepis biserrata (Sw.) Schott. (syn. Aspidium bisseratum Sw., Aspidium acutum Schkuhr, Nephrolepis acuta (Schkuhr) C. Presl, Polypodium puctulatum Poir)
 Nephrolepis cordifolia (L.) C. Presl (syn. Polypodium cordifolium L., Nephrolepis tuberosa (Bory ex Willd.) C. Presl, Aspidium tuberosum Bory ex Willd.)
 Nephrolepis exaltata (L.) Schott (syn. Polypodium exaltatum L.)
 Nephrolepis falcata 
 Nephrolepis multiflora (Roxb.) F.M. Jarret ex C.V. Morton (syn. Davallia multiflora Roxb.)
 Nephrolepis obliterata
 Nephrolepis pectinata (Willd.) Schott  (syn. Aspidium pectinatum Willd.)
 Nephrolepis tuberosa

Some species of Nephrolepis are grown as ornamental plants.
Nephrolepis exaltata and Nephrolepis obliterata are reported to be good plants for cleaning indoor air.

Some Nephrolepis species may prove to be a good source of new antimicrobial chemicals.

References

Further reading
 Hennequin, S., Hovenkamp, P., Christenhusz, M.J.M. & Schneider, H. (2010) Phylogenetics and biogeography of Nephrolepis – a tale of old settlers and young tramps. Bot. J. Linn. Soc. 164(2): 113–127. 
 Lorenzi, H. & Souza, M. S. (2001). Plantas Ornamentais no Brasil: arbustivas, herbáceas e trepadeiras. Plantarum

External links

 USDA Plants Profile for Nephrolepis (swordfern)
 Nephrolepis biserrata At: Nephrolepis At: Biodiversity Database At: Cook Islands Biodiversity Website

 
Polypodiales
Fern genera